The Westin Dragonara Hotel is a hotel in Paceville, St. Julian's, Malta. It is located near the Dragonara Palace, both being at Dragonara Point. The hotel is situated 5 minutes away from the island's major highway which connects all major sites in Malta.

Renovation

After renovating its Luxury Bay Suites in 2018, the hotel announced in July 2020 it has completed a €40 million makeover. The conception of the renovated suites and guest rooms was made by London-based interior designer Lynne Hunt.

External links
Official website

References

Hotels in Malta
Hotels established in 1997
Hotel buildings completed in 1997